Northwestern Medicine McHenry Hospital is a hospital in McHenry, Illinois. Previously, the hospital was called Northern Illinois Medical Center and later Centegra Hospital - McHenry. The hospital is a division of Northwestern Medicine since 2018 when Northwestern Medicine partnered with Centegra Health System.

History
In 1956, Dr. Lee Gladstone built a clinic on Green Street in the city of McHenry. The first and second floor included an emergency room, operating room, reception areas and offices for outpatient physician care. The ground floor provided 22 beds for new born, pediatric and adult patients. A McHenry Hospital addition was soon built near the clinic on Waukegan Avenue. With the rapid growth of population, a new McHenry Hospital was built in 1984 on Illinois Route 31 and Bull Valley Road and was named Northern Illinois Medical Center.

Notes

References

External links

Hospital buildings completed in 1956
Hospital buildings completed in 1984
1956 establishments in Illinois
Buildings and structures in McHenry County, Illinois
Hospitals established in 1956
Hospitals in Illinois
McHenry, Illinois
Northwestern Medicine